The Murphy Elite is a Canadian light aircraft that was designed and is produced by Murphy Aircraft of Chilliwack, British Columbia. The aircraft is supplied as a kit for amateur construction.

When it was introduced in April 1996 it was originally known as the Rebel Elite.

Design and development
The Elite was originally designed as a tricycle gear version of the Murphy Rebel, although it is now also offered with conventional landing gear as an option. It also incorporated some improvements over the Rebel, including a reinforced airframe, cantilever tailplane with a one-piece elevator, all-metal control surfaces, split configuration flaps, and upgraded wing attachment points and leading edges. The Elite features a strut-braced high-wing, three seats, tricycle landing gear and a single engine in tractor configuration.

The aircraft is made from aluminum sheet. Its  span wing is supported by single lift struts. The occupants are accommodated in an enclosed cabin of  width, with doors for access and egress.

Construction time from the factory kit is estimated at 1400 hours. The Elite can be operated on wheels, including tundra tires, skis and floats.

Specifications (Elite)

References

External links

Photos of the Elite
Photo of an Elite on amphibious floats

Homebuilt aircraft
Single-engined tractor aircraft
Elite
High-wing aircraft
Aircraft first flown in 1996